Ryu So-yeon (Korean 유소연, RR Ryu So-yeon, MR Ryu Soyŏn, ; born 29 June 1990), also known as So Yeon Ryu, is a South Korean professional golfer who plays on the LPGA Tour and on the  LPGA of Korea Tour.

She is a two-time major winner having won the 2011 U.S. Women's Open and the 2017 ANA Inspiration.

On 26 June 2017, she became only the 11th No. 1 ranked golfer in the Rolex Rankings by virtue of winning her 5th LPGA Tour title at the Walmart NW Arkansas Championship.

Professional career
Ryu turned professional in 2007 at age 17. Her first win as a professional came in February 2008 on the American Cactus Tour, in which she won by six strokes. She then joined the LPGA of Korea, winning the first event she played, the Sports Seoul Open.

On 11 July 2011, Ryu won the U.S. Women's Open. On the 18th hole of the final round, the toughest hole for the tournament, she trailed the clubhouse leader Hee Kyung Seo by one stroke, but hit her approach to 6 feet and made the birdie putt to force a playoff. Ryu won the three-hole playoff with a birdie on the last hole.

Ryu picked up her second career LPGA Tour win in 2012 at the Jamie Farr Toledo Classic. With one tournament still to play in the season, Ryu had a big enough lead in the LPGA Rookie of the Year points standings to clinch the award for the season.

On 23 June 2013, Ryu lost in a sudden-death playoff at the Walmart NW Arkansas Championship to fellow South Korean Inbee Park. Park made birdie on the first extra hole to take the victory after Ryu could only make par.

On 2 April 2017, Ryu won her second major championship at the ANA Inspiration with a sudden-death playoff victory over Lexi Thompson. The tournament was controversial though, after leader Thompson was handed a retrospective four stroke penalty midway through the final round, for an infringement reported by a TV viewer during the third round. Thompson was found to have incorrectly marked and replaced her ball on the 17th hole during the third round. At the time, Thompson had a two stroke advantage. Ryu went on to win with a birdie on the first extra hole of the playoff.

On 25 June 2017, Ryu won the Walmart NW Arkansas Championship and became the number one golfer in the Women's World Golf Rankings.

Personal life
Ryu took classes at Yonsei University while also competing full-time on the LPGA Tour. She graduated in February 2013 with a degree in sports business.

Professional wins (20)

LPGA Tour wins (6)

LPGA Tour playoff record (2–4)

LPGA of Korea Tour wins (10)

LPGA of Japan Tour wins (1)

Ladies European Tour wins (1)

Cactus Tour wins (1)

Other wins (2)
2014 Mission Hills World Ladies Championship - team (with Inbee Park)
2015 World Ladies Championship - team (with Inbee Park)

Major championships

Wins (2)

1 Defeated Hee Kyung Seo in a three-hole playoff: Ryu (3-4-3=10) and Seo (3-6-4=13)
2 Defeated Lexi Thompson in a sudden death playoff with birdie on first extra hole

Results timeline
Results not in chronological order before 2019.

^ The Evian Championship was added as a major in 2013.

DQ = disqualified
CUT = missed the half-way cut
NT = no tournament
T = tied

Summary

Most consecutive cuts made – 24 (2015 ANA – 2019 Evian)
Longest streak of top-10s – 3 (twice)

LPGA Tour career summary

 official through the 2022 season

* Includes matchplay and other events without a cut.
Ryu was not a member of the LPGA Tour until 2012. Money earned from 2008 to 2011 was not considered official by the LPGA Tour.

World ranking
Position in Women's World Golf Rankings at the end of each calendar year.

Team appearances
Amateur
Espirito Santo Trophy (representing South Korea): 2006

Professional
International Crown (representing South Korea): 2014, 2016, 2018 (winners)

References

External links

Profile on SeoulSisters.com
Profile at Yahoo! Sports

South Korean female golfers
LPGA of Korea Tour golfers
LPGA Tour golfers
Winners of LPGA major golf championships
Asian Games medalists in golf
Asian Games gold medalists for South Korea
Golfers at the 2006 Asian Games
Medalists at the 2006 Asian Games
Golfers from Seoul
Yonsei University alumni
1990 births
Living people